The Talaiotic Culture or Talaiotic Period is the name used to describe the society that existed on the Gymnesian Islands (the easternmost Balearic Islands) during the Iron Age.  Its origins date from the end of the second millennium BC, when the inaccurately named Pre-Talaiotic Culture underwent a crisis and evolved into the Talaiotic Culture.  Its name is derived from the talaiots, which are the most abundant and emblematic structures from the prehistoric period of the Balearic Islands.

Origins 

Up until the end of the 20th century, it was theorized that the Talaiotic Culture arose out of interaction between new peoples from the eastern Mediterranean and local island culture, in the form of an aggressive invasion, or perhaps as a peaceful assimilation.  The Talaiotic Culture arose at the same time that the crisis caused by the Sea Peoples was occurring, which had revolutionized societies in this part of the Mediterranean until the 13th century BC.  These theories were based mainly on architectonic remains that exist in abundance on Majorca and Menorca.  The Talaiotic people were considered a warlike race due to the abundance of talaiots or defensive towers and the existence of walled towns.  In addition, the talaiots were similar in many respects to the nuraghes of Sardinia, which lends credence to the theory that the Talaiotic people were of Sardinian origin.

However, archaeological excavations conducted at the end of the 20th and beginning of the 21st centuries have established that the talaiots were built much later –at the beginning of the first millennium BC, which means that they were not built during the time of the Sea Peoples and the Sardinian nuraghes.  In addition, there is more and more proof that what was considered a sudden transition from a Pre-Talaiotic Culture during the Bronze Age to the Talaiotic Culture was actually a slow evolution lasting several centuries, and actually caused by a localized crisis on the Balearic Islands.  However, external influences on the Talaiotic Culture cannot be completely discounted, since the existence of bronze alloys on the island (which requires tin, not available on the Balearic Islands) indicates that frequent contacts with the outside world existed.

History 
The first evidence indicating the development of this culture appeared at the end of the 2nd millennium BC, when island society was threatened by population increases, inefficient food production, and limited living space.  Agricultural techniques that the first inhabitants had brought with them a millennium before in the Copper Age consisted of planting in newly-broken ground by burning forests and plowing the newly cleared ground. This technique resulted in a rapid deterioration of fertile land, and may be the main cause for the almost completely meat-based diet of the islanders towards the end of the Bronze Age.

The Talaiotic Period in Majorca 

The first great monuments on Majorca from this period are the Layered Tumuli (Túmulos Escalonados), which had a funerary purpose.  The date of their construction dates from the end of the second millennium BC to the beginnings of the first millennium BC, and many of the Tumuli are associated with hypogea from the Bronze Age.  In sum, the society of this era is called "Proto-Talaiotic," since many features of the subsequent Talaiotic society begin to appear at this time.  These features include the clustering of the population into towns.  It has been confirmed that in some of these Talaiotic towns naviform structures were dismantled in order to use the building material to build ordinary dwellings.

At the beginning of the first millennium BC, talaiots began to proliferate on Majorca, either appearing in isolated fashion as a territorial boundary stone, or in towns, but mostly grouped together in ceremonial centers.  In Majorca, these ceremonial centers were as abundant as the towns themselves.  Some of them consisted of small groups of stone structures (talaiots, tumuli), scattered across the island, and frequently serving as boundary stones between the towns.  
Some of these ceremonial centers consisted of a line of up to seven stone structures across a distance of more than half a kilometer.  The abundance of these centers serves as evidence of their importance: most likely they were where frequent disputes were resolved, and where various festivities were celebrated.  The centers also served as a seasonal and economic calendar (economic activities such as sowing, harvests, hunting), in which the young people of various towns could meet (thus guaranteeing outbreeding).

Sanctuaries also existed on the island, recognizable because their two rear corners are rounded.  Sanctuaries situated within the towns were small, and their interiors had only a single column, which was more or less centered.  The sanctuaries in the countryside were much bigger (10–15 m.) and tended to have many pairs of columns.    
   
The funerary monuments of Majorca were varied, a characteristic similar to the previous age: burials were made in natural caves and in hypogea.  The Talaiotic hypogea were much bigger than those from the Bronze Age, sometimes with column excavated from the surrounding rock, and the enlargement of these columns provided a reason for enlarging the hypogea themselves.  A large cemetery was also built, the Necropolis of Son Real, unique to Majorca and Menorca.  The Necropolis served as a cemetery in which the tombs were similar to small talaiots, and were either circular or square-shaped.  Small "navetas" can also be found in the Necropolis.  Despite the Talaiotic preference for burials to occur in hypogea, during the time of the Talaiotic Culture a novelty was introduced: the burial of a body with lime.

A 3,200-year-old well-preserved Bronze Age sword was discovered by archaeologists under the leadership of  Jaume Deya and Pablo Galera on the Mallorca Island in the Puigpunyent from the stone megaliths site Talaiot. Specialists assumed that the weapon was made when the Talaiotic culture was in critical comedown. The sword will be on display at the nearby Majorca Museum.

The Talaiotic Period in Menorca 

The reorganization of Menorcan society into chieftainships and towns occurred on similar lines to societal changes on Mallorca, although some Menorcan towns were much larger than Majorcan ones, indicating, perhaps, the existence of stronger social changes or tensions.  The variety of monuments on Menorca (besides talaiots) constructed from the end of the Bronze Age and throughout the Iron Age, surpasses that found on Mallorca.  At the end of the 2nd millennium BC, there appeared tombs known as “navetas.”   They were built with Talaiotic techniques, but were also drawn from a very ancient tradition that contains many similarities to the tradition of the construction of dolmens going back a previous millennium. 
 
The construction known as the Taula is considered the most emblematic ceremonial monument of Menorca.  It served as a sanctuary, and its enclosure had a horseshoe form, similar to those found on Mallorca but unlike the Majorcan variety, had a great central structure resembling a table (“taula” means “table” in the Catalan language).  The exact construction date of these sanctuaries is not known, although the enclosures could have existed throughout the Talaiotic, and the central monuments could belong to any date throughout the first millennium.

The first author who wrote about the Talayotic monuments of Menorca was Juan Ramis in his book Celtic antiques on the island of Menorca, which was edited 1818, being the first book in Spanish language entirely devoted to Prehistory.

The end of the Talaiotic Period 
The very factors that gave rise to the Talaiotic Period spelled its doom.  Construction of talaiots ceased, and many of them were destroyed or converted for different uses.  The nearby Punic center of Ebusus, present-day Ibiza, increased its commercial influence to include the Gymnesian Islands; this economic extension in effect transformed itself into an actual Punic colonization of the Gymnesian Islands.  The Mediterranean subsequently became dominated by the Roman and Carthaginian Empires.  The Punic Wars would erupt between these two powers, and the islands of Mallorca and Menorca would be forcibly dragged into what is called the Post-Talaiotic Period (also known as the Balearic Culture or Post-Talaiotic Culture).

References

External links 
 Talaiotic culture in Menorca. Megalithic monuments. Discovering Menorca.
  Arqueobalear — Archaeology website on the Balearic Islands.
 La guía online de la prehistoria en Mallorca y Menorca
 Museu arqueològic de Son Fornés, Mallorca
 L'Arqueologia de Menorca - La Arqueología de Menorca - The Archaeology of Minorca
 Patrimoni històric de Menorca
 Talatí de Dalt
 Son Catlar

Iron Age cultures of Europe
Archaeological cultures of Southwestern Europe
Prehistory of the Balearic Islands
Archaeological cultures in Spain
Iron Age Spain